Sogadu Shivanna is a senior politician associated with Bharatiya Janata Party, Karnataka. He has served as Minister of Environment under Jagadish Shettar and as Minister of Sericulture under H. D. Kumaraswamy.

Political career 
Shivanna contested 1994 Karnataka Assembly election on a BJP ticket from Tumkur City and defeated the sitting MLA S. Shafi Ahmed of Congress by a margin of 9104 votes. He went on to retain the seat in 1999 & 2004 election. He was inducted as a Minister in the Kumaraswamy cabinet which was supported by the BJP on 25 January 2007 and was allotted the Sericulture Department. In 2008 election, he managed to retain his constituency by a meagre margin of 1949. In July 2012 he was inducted into the cabinet of Jagadish Shettar and was allotted Environment portfolio. He however lost 2013 election to the Congress candidate Dr Rafeeq Ahmed. In 2018 election he was denied ticket from Tumkur City in favour of G.B. Jyoti Ganesh at the behest of Yediyurappa since Shivanna did not join the KJP when it was formed by Yediyurappa.

References 

Karnataka MLAs 1994–1999
Karnataka MLAs 1999–2004
Karnataka MLAs 2004–2007
Living people
Year of birth missing (living people)
Karnataka MLAs 2008–2013
People from Tumkur district
Bharatiya Janata Party politicians from Karnataka